(), also known as  or, more recently, is a private railroad that connects inner Tokyo to Kawasaki, Yokohama, Yokosuka and other points on the Miura Peninsula in Kanagawa Prefecture. It also provides rail access to Haneda Airport in Tokyo.  means the  -  area. The company's railroad origins date back to 1898, but the current company dates to 1948.

It is a member of the Fuyo Group and has its headquarters in Yokohama. 
The company changed its English name from Keihin Electric Express Railway Co., Ltd. to Keikyu Corporation on 21 October 2010.

Lines 

The Keikyu Main Line runs between south area of Tokyo, Kawasaki, Yokohama, and Yokosuka. Shinagawa Station is the terminal station in Tokyo of this line. Its  limited-stop service competes with JR East's Tōkaidō Main Line and Yokosuka Line.

From Sengakuji station, Keikyu trains run into the Toei Asakusa Line and Keisei Electric Railway (to Narita Airport) and Hokuso Railway (to Chiba newtown area) lines.

Stations 

There are a total of 73 “unique” stations (i.e., counting stations served by multiple lines only once) on the Keikyu network, or 77 total stations if each station on each line counts as one station.

Rolling stock

Active 
Keikyu currently has 802 vehicles available for passenger revenue service.

 600 series (introduced 1994)
 New1000 series(In Japanese:新1000形) (introduced 2002)
 1500 series (introduced 1985)
 2100 series (introduced 1998)

Retired 
 230 series (introduced 1930)
 400 series (introduced 1965)
 500 series (introduced 1951)
 700 series (1956–1986, reclassified 600 series from 1966)
 700 series (II) (1967–2005)
 800 series (introduced 1958, reclassified 1000 series)
 1000 series (1959–2010)
 2000 series (1982–2018)
 800 series (1978–2019)

Accidents 
Since 1997, Keikyu has had five accidents, all of which were on the main line, in the vicinity of Yokosuka and Yokohama.

On 7 April 1997, at about 2:47 pm, the first three cars of a four-car train derailed after colliding with a mudslide, resulting in 22 people injured. The accident occurred between Keikyu-Taura(In Japanese:京急田浦) and Anjinzuka(InJapanese:安針塚 or 按針塚) stations, with approximately 60 people on board. Heavy rains caused the mudslide, 7 months after a report by the train company to the Transportation Minister that there was little probability of such an occurrence in that area. 500 workers were mobilized as the train service was temporarily suspended between Kanazawa-Hakkei and Horinouchi Stations.

On 24 November 2000, at about 5:20 am, the front car of a four-car train derailed after a truck collided with the first car of the train at a railroad crossing, resulting in 3 passengers being slightly injured. The accident occurred in Yokosuka and the approximately 100 commuters on board later walked about 200 m to the nearest station to continue their commute via bus. The driver of the truck reported his foot became stuck between the accelerator and brake pedals, sending him through the crossing bar and into the crossing. Normal operations continued about 4 hours later that morning.

On 24 September 2012, at about 11:58 pm, the first three cars of an eight-car train derailed after colliding with a mudslide, resulting in injuries to 28 people including the train driver. 7 men and women were seriously injured, including fractures, broken ribs and pelvises. The accident occurred between Oppama and Keikyu Taura stations, between Yokohama and Yokosuka, with approximately 700 passengers on board. Heavy rains caused the mudslide, sweeping away safety nets that had been installed in 1998, the year after a similar mudslide in the area. An area of soil about 12 meters high and 15 meters wide fell onto the tracks, bringing trees and fencing structures with it. The train was travelling 75 km/h before the driver applied the brakes, 30 to 40 meters before the mudslide. Train services were temporarily suspended between Kanazawa-Hakkei and Hemi stations and temporary bus services were provided by the train company until normal operations resumed approximately  hours later after the assessment and clean-up process.

On 18 April 2013, at about 4:30 pm, two window panes shattered in the front car of a local commuter train while passing an express train going the opposite direction, resulting in minor lacerations to two high school students sitting with their backs to the windows. One window pane was also cracked on the passing train with no injuries. The accident occurred between Taura and Anjinzuka stations, with approximately 30 people in that car at the time of the accident.

On 5 September 2019 a limited express train crashed into a truck in nearby Kanagawa-Shinmachi Station. There were 33 injuries and 1 death (truck driver).

References

Further reading

External links 

  
 Keikyu website

 
Railway companies of Japan
Real estate companies based in Tokyo
Retail companies based in Tokyo
Transport companies based in Tokyo
Fuyo Group
Companies listed on the Tokyo Stock Exchange